The Troina is a torrent in Sicily. It is located near a town also named Troina and is in the comune also bearing that name. It is both the inflow and outflow for Lake Ancipa. It empties into the Simeto near Bronte.

References

Rivers of Italy
Rivers of Sicily
Rivers of the Province of Enna
Rivers of the Metropolitan City of Messina